The Mazzaferro clan is an 'ndrina of the 'Ndrangheta, a criminal and mafia-type organization in Calabria, Italy. The 'ndrina is based in Marina di Gioiosa Ionica.

In the 1970s the Mazzaferro clan entered in the smuggling of cigarettes and bursts out a bloody feud against the Aquino-Scali 'ndrina, from the same town. The Mazzaferro family has close ties to the Lo Presti crime family of Bardonecchia. 

They have connections in Europe, United States and Canada. They're present in North Italy. Piedmont and Lombardia. In Piedmont the rappresentative person of the Mazzaferro family was their cousin Rocco Lo Presti, historical 'Ndrangheta boss of Bardonecchia and Val di Susa. 

Their activities range from arms trafficking to drug trafficking hashish and cocaine. 

On January 14, 1993, in Marina di Gioiosa Ionica was killed, Vincenzo Mazzaferro, undisputed head of the family

Feud with Aquino clan 
In the '70s they enter into the smuggling of cigarettes and the feud breaks out which still sees the Aquino-Scali 'ndrina opposed on the one hand and the Mazzaferro-Femia 'ndrina on the other.

See also 
 Francesco Mazzaferro
 Rocco Lo Presti
 List of 'ndrine

References

Further reading 
 
'Ndrine
1960s establishments in Italy
Organisations based in Calabria